The 1926 Tennessee Volunteers football team (variously "Tennessee", "UT" or the "Vols") represented the University of Tennessee in the 1926 college football season.  Playing as a member of the Southern Conference (SoCon), the team was led by head coach Robert Neyland, in his first year, and played their home games at Shields–Watkins Field in Knoxville, Tennessee. The 1926 Vols won eight and lost one game (8–1 overall, 5–1 in the SoCon). They won their first seven games of the season before losing to in-state rival, Vanderbilt. Tennessee outscored their opponents 151 to 34 and posted five shutouts.

Schedule

References

Tennessee
Tennessee Volunteers football seasons
Tennessee Volunteers football